Mr. Nobody is a film score by Belgian musician Pierre Van Dormael, released on January 26, 2010 in Belgium, accompanying the 2009 film of the same name, directed by Jaco Van Dormael and starring Jared Leto, Sarah Polley, Diane Kruger, and Linh Dan Pham. Mr. Nobody is the last film of composer Pierre Van Dormael before his death in 2008.

Background
Like Jaco Van Dormael's previous films, the score for Mr. Nobody was written by Pierre Van Dormael. The director did not want the music to be overtly emotional, so he and Pierre chose a minimalist orchestration, more often than not just a single guitar. The score was finished after Pierre was diagnosed with terminal cancer.

At the 2010 Magritte Awards, the film received six awards and Pierre Van Dormael won Best Original Score posthumously.

Track listing

Personnel

Musicians
 Pierre Van Dormael – guitar
 Eric Baeten – violin
 Jean Pierre Borboux – cello
 Cristina Constantinescu – violin
 Stijn Daveniers – cello
 Philippe de Cock – acoustic piano
 Liesbeth de Lombaert – cello
 Peter Despiegelaere – violin
 Véronique Gilis – violin
 Manuel Hermia – flute
 Ivo Lintermans – violin
 Antoine Maisonhaute – violin
 Romain Montfort – cello
 Mark Steylaerts – violin (concertmaster)
 Marian Tache – violin

 Dirk Uten – violin
 Hans Vandaele – cello
 Gudrun Vercampt – violin
 Eva Vermeren – violin
 Inge Walraet – violin

Technical and production
 Pierre Van Dormael – arrangement, production, recording (PVD Studio)
 Philippe de Cock – string arranger, production
 Philippe Delire – recording (ICP Studio)
 Jarek Frankowski – mixing (Acoustic Recordings)
 Olivier Gérard – mixing (Synsound)
 Henri Greindl – mastering
 Dan Lacksman – mixing (Synsound)
 David Minjauw – recording (Dada Studio)
 Stéphane Owen – recording (Yellow Sub Studio)

References

External links

Mr. Nobody at MusicBrainz

Film scores
2010 soundtrack albums

fr:Mr. Nobody#Bande originale